Miguel Ángel Gómez López (born 15 May 1998), known as Miguel Ángel, is a Spanish footballer who plays for Albacete Balompié as a forward.

Club career
Born in Casas-Ibáñez, Albacete, Castile-La Mancha, Miguel Ángel represented UD Albacer as a youth. In 2017 he joined Albacete Balompié, being immediately loaned to Tercera División side UD Almansa for the season.

Miguel Ángel made his senior debut on 20 August 2017, starting and scoring a brace in a 2–1 home win against CD Villacañas. On 20 December, he was recalled by his parent club, and was assigned to the reserves also in the fourth division.

Miguel Ángel made his professional debut on 2 March 2019, coming on as a late substitute for Néstor Susaeta in a 0–1 away loss against Cádiz CF in the Segunda División. However, he spent the most of the 2019–20 campaign nursing a knee injury.

On 5 October 2020, Miguel Ángel was loaned to Getafe CF B in the third division, for one year.

References

External links

1998 births
Living people
Sportspeople from the Province of Albacete
Spanish footballers
Footballers from Castilla–La Mancha
Association football forwards
Segunda División players
Segunda División B players
Tercera División players
Atlético Albacete players
UD Almansa players
Albacete Balompié players
Getafe CF B players